Pilot is the name of two places in the U.S. state of North Carolina:
Pilot, Davidson County, North Carolina
Pilot, Franklin County, North Carolina

See also
Mount Pilot
Pilot Mountain, North Carolina